Herbal stores are shops which sell medicinal plants and related products like spices, essential oils, flower essences, tinctures and elixirs.

See also 
 Herbalism
 Botánica
 Herbal tea shops
 Health food store

Retailers by type of merchandise sold